Tina Chen (Traditional Chinese: 陳婷, Hanyu Pinyin: Chén Tíng) (born November 2, 1943) is a Chinese-American stage, film, and television actress who starred in the films Alice's Restaurant, Three Days of the Condor, and The Hawaiians.

Early life
Tina Chen lived briefly in mainland China, Hong Kong, Taiwan , Japan, and then came to the United States. While pursuing her acting career, Chen worked for over a decade as a researcher in the Serology & Genetics department at the New York Blood Center.

She also co-founded Food Liberation, one of the first health food stores in New York City.

Career
Tina Chen has been nominated for Golden Globe, Emmy, and Drama Desk awards. Her films include the independent feature Almost Perfect and the short film The Potential Wives of Norman Mao. She also starred in The Hawaiians, for which she received a Golden Globe award nomination; Alice's Restaurant, Three Days of the Condor, and Face.

Tina has guest starred on numerous TV shows and was nominated for an Emmy for her performance in the CBS Playhouse special The Final War of Olly Winter.

Chen has directed plays at various theaters in New York, including Pan Asian Repertory Theatre's production of Fairy Bones starring Lucy Liu in her stage debut. Tina co-produced the Broadway production of the Peter Nichols play, Passion Play, starring Frank Langella, and received a Drama Desk nomination as part of the producing team of the Broadway production of The Rink, by Terrence McNally, starring Chita Rivera and Liza Minnelli.

Work
Film
 Descendants of the Past, Ancestors of the Future
 Almost Perfect (2011)
 The Potential Wives of Norman Mao
 Face (2002)
 The Ghost of Flight 401 (1978)
 Three Days of the Condor (1975)
 Paper Man (1971)
 The Hawaiians (1970)
 Alice's Restaurant (1969)

Made for Television Specials
 Lady from Yesterday (CBS) 
 Year of the Dragon (PBS)
 13 Stars for Channel 13 (PBS)
 The Final War of Olly Winter (CBS Playhouse)

Episodic Television
 Mercy
 Central Park West
 The Devlin Connection
 Dan August
 The Streets of San Francisco
 Harry O
 The Man and the City
 Airwolf
 City Kids
 Kung Fu
 The Delphi Bureau
 The Tonight Show Starring Johnny Carson

Theatre
 The Love Suicide at Schofield Barracks
 The Shanghai Gesture
 Comfort Women
 Empress of China
 The Joy Luck Club
 The Innocence of Ghosts
 The Chang Fragments
 Arthur and Leila
 Madame de Sade
 Family Devotions (by David Henry Hwang)
 The Year of the Dragon (by Frank Chin)
 A Midsummer Night's Dream
 Tropical Tree
 In the Heart of America
 A Small Delegation
 Widescreen Version
 As the Crow Flies (by David Henry Hwang)
 A Streetcar Named Desire
 Santa Anita '42
 The Kitchen God's Wife
 A Song for All Saints
 Darkness Within

Directing
 Tea (by Velina Hasu Houston)
 The Shining Queen
 At Plank Bridge
 Kokoro/True Heart (by Velina Hasu Houston)
 Yin Chin Bow
 Fairy Bones (Lucy Liu)

Producing
 The Shining Queen
 Beyond Gravity
 Best Kept Secret
 The Rink (Drama Desk Nomination; by Terrence McNally; starring Chita Rivera and Liza Minnelli)
 Passion Play (by Peter Nichols; starring Frank Langella)

Lecture
Chen's lecture, "Heroes of History: Legacy of My Chinese Family" features 158 biographical photos. It is about three generations of her mother's family and their contributions to the history of China. In the lecture, which has been presented at New York City's China Institute, Urban Stages, and the Mirror Repertory Co., she talks about her great-grandfather.

Awards
Chen received a Golden Globe nomination for her supporting performance in the film The Hawaiians.  She received an Emmy nomination for her supporting performance in the CBS Playhouse drama "The Final War of Olly Winter." She also received a Drama Desk nomination for Outstanding Production of a Musical for, The Rink, starring Chita Rivera and Liza Minnelli.

Other awards include Urban Stages 25th Anniversary Award for Artistic Brilliance, Women's Project's Women of Achievement Award, Girl Scouts Woman of Distinction Award, the Anna May Wong Award of Excellence, and Pan Asian Repertory Theatre's Legacy Award.

References

External links

1943 births
Living people
20th-century American actresses
21st-century American actresses
American actresses of Chinese descent
American film actresses
American stage actresses
American television actresses
American theatre directors of Chinese descent
American theatre managers and producers
Chinese emigrants to the United States
Actresses from Chongqing
Place of birth missing (living people)
Chinese stage actresses
Chinese film actresses
Chinese television actresses
20th-century Chinese actresses
21st-century Chinese actresses